Minuscule 646 (in the Gregory-Aland numbering), ε 2059 (von Soden), is a Greek minuscule manuscript of the New Testament, on parchment. Palaeographically it has been assigned to the 16th century. The manuscript is lacunose. Scrivener labeled by 721e.

Description 

The codex contains the text of the four Gospels, on 214 parchment leaves (size ), with only one lacuna at the end of Gospel of John (John 21:20-25). The text is written in one column per page, 22-29 lines per page, by several hands.

Text 

Kurt Aland the Greek text of the codex did not place in any Category.
It was not examined by using Claremont Profile Method. In result its textual character is still not determined.

History 

Scrivener dated the manuscript to the 13th century. Gregory dated it to the 14th century. Actually the manuscript is dated by the INTF to the 16th century.

Formerly the manuscript was held in Mar Saba, then in Constantinople (Hagia Taphu 436). The manuscript was added to the list of New Testament manuscripts by Scrivener (721) and Gregory (646). Gregory saw the manuscript in 1886.

The manuscript currently is housed at the National Library of Greece (Taphu 218), at Athens.

See also 

 List of New Testament minuscules
 Biblical manuscript
 Textual criticism

References

Further reading 

 

Greek New Testament minuscules
16th-century biblical manuscripts
Manuscripts of the National Library of Greece